Rory Bosio is an American ultramarathon runner. She is specializes in mountain running, and won the 2013 and 2014 Ultra-Trail du Mont-Blanc.

Bosio is a pediatric intensive care nurse from Truckee, California, United States. She grew up in Truckee attending North Tahoe High School, where she ran her first 1-mile race at the age of 8. In 8th grade, she won her local cross country championships, and later spent time hiking and mountain climbing around the Sierra Nevada. In 2007, she graduated from the University of Davis, California.

Bosio spent 10 months in 2015 filming for the reality documentary series Boundless for its third season on Travel+Escape Channel and Esquire Network. Rory has been sponsored athlete with The North Face and CamelBak.

Results

References

External links 
 http://www.thenorthface.com/en_US/exploration/athletes/62-rory-bosio/
 Rory Bosio on Ultra Signup.

Living people
1984 births
American female ultramarathon runners
University of California, Davis alumni
21st-century American women